"The Way It Used to Be" is a song by Mike Posner. The song was released as promotional single in the United States on June 11, 2013 as a digital download. The song peaked at number 73 on the Australian Singles Chart.

Music video
A music video to accompany the release of "The Way It Used to Be" was first released onto YouTube on August 15, 2013 at a total length of four minutes and three seconds. It depicts Posner vying for the affection of an ex lover.

Reception 
Rose Lilah, writing for Hot New Hip Hop, called it a "fine addition" to Posner's body of work.

Track listing

Chart performance

Release history

References

2013 singles
2013 songs
Mike Posner songs
Songs written by Mike Posner
Songs written by Martin Johnson (musician)
RCA Records singles
Songs written by Ammo (record producer)